Cristiano Lima da Silva (born January 10, 1979 in Osasco), known as Cris, is a Brazilian footballer who plays for Catanduvense as defender.

Career statistics

Career

References

External links

1979 births
Living people
Brazilian footballers
Association football defenders
Campeonato Brasileiro Série B players
Campeonato Brasileiro Série A players
Clube Atlético Bragantino players
Oeste Futebol Clube players
People from Osasco
Footballers from São Paulo (state)